A zoonosis (plural zoonoses) or zoonotic disease is an infectious disease of humans caused by a pathogen (an infectious agent, such as a bacterium, virus, parasite or prion) that can jump from a non-human (usually a vertebrate) to a human and vice versa. 

Major modern diseases such as Ebola virus disease and salmonellosis are zoonoses. HIV was a zoonotic disease transmitted to humans in the early part of the 20th century, though it has now evolved into a separate human-only disease. Most strains of influenza that infect humans are human diseases, although many strains of bird flu and swine flu are zoonoses; these viruses occasionally recombine with human strains of the flu and can cause pandemics such as the 1918 Spanish flu or the 2009 swine flu. Taenia solium infection is one of the neglected tropical diseases with public health and veterinary concern in endemic regions. Zoonoses can be caused by a range of disease pathogens such as emergent viruses, bacteria, fungi and parasites; of 1,415 pathogens known to infect humans, 61% were zoonotic. Most human diseases originated in non-humans; however, only diseases that routinely involve non-human to human transmission, such as rabies, are considered direct zoonoses.

Zoonoses have different modes of transmission. In direct zoonosis the disease is directly transmitted from non-humans to humans through media such as air (influenza) or through bites and saliva (rabies). In contrast, transmission can also occur via an intermediate species (referred to as a vector), which carry the disease pathogen without getting sick. When humans infect non-humans, it is called reverse zoonosis or anthroponosis. The term is from Greek: ζῷον zoon "animal" and νόσος nosos "sickness".

Host genetics plays an important role in determining which non-human viruses will be able to make copies of themselves in the human body. Dangerous non-human viruses are those that require few mutations to begin replicating themselves in human cells. These viruses are dangerous since the required combinations of mutations might randomly arise in the natural reservoir.

Causes 
The emergence of zoonotic diseases originated with the domestication of animals. Zoonotic transmission can occur in any context in which there is contact with or consumption of animals, animal products, or animal derivatives. This can occur in a companionistic (pets), economic (farming, trade, butchering, etc.), predatory (hunting, butchering or consuming wild game) or research context.

Recently, there has been a rise in frequency of appearance of new zoonotic diseases. "Approximately 1.67 million undescribed viruses are thought to exist in mammals and birds, up to half of which are estimated to have the potential to spill over into humans," says a study led by researchers at the University of California, Davis. According to a report from the United Nations Environment Programme and International Livestock Research Institute large part of the causes are environmental like climate change, unsustainable agriculture, exploitation of wildlife, land use change. Others are linked to changes in human society like more mobility. The organizations propose a set of measures to stop the rise.

Contamination of food or water supply
The most significant zoonotic pathogens causing foodborne diseases are Escherichia coli O157:H7, Campylobacter, Caliciviridae, and Salmonella.

In 2006 a conference held in Berlin focused on the issue of zoonotic pathogen effects on food safety, urging government intervention and public vigilance against the risks of catching food-borne diseases from farm-to-table dining.

Many food-borne outbreaks can be linked to zoonotic pathogens. Many different types of food that have an animal origin can become contaminated. Some common food items linked to zoonotic contaminations include eggs, seafood, meat, dairy, and even some vegetables.

Outbreaks involving contaminated food should be handled in preparedness plans to prevent widespread outbreaks and to efficiently and effectively contain outbreaks.

Farming, ranching and animal husbandry 

Contact with farm animals can lead to disease in farmers or others that come into contact with infected farm animals. Glanders primarily affects those who work closely with horses and donkeys. Close contact with cattle can lead to cutaneous anthrax infection, whereas inhalation anthrax infection is more common for workers in slaughterhouses, tanneries and wool mills. Close contact with sheep who have recently given birth can lead to infection with the bacterium Chlamydia psittaci, causing chlamydiosis (and enzootic abortion in pregnant women), as well as increase the risk of Q fever, toxoplasmosis, and listeriosis, in the pregnant or otherwise immunocompromised. Echinococcosis is caused by a tapeworm, which can spread from infected sheep by food or water contaminated by feces or wool. Bird flu is common in chickens and, while rare in humans, the main public health worry is that a strain of bird flu will recombine with a human flu virus and cause a pandemic like the 1918 Spanish flu. In 2017, free-range chickens in the UK were temporarily ordered to remain inside due to the threat of bird flu. Cattle are an important reservoir of cryptosporidiosis, which mainly affects the immunocompromised. Reports have shown mink can also become infected. In Western countries, Hepatitis E burden is largely dependent on exposure to animal products, and pork is a significant source of infection, in this respect.

Veterinarians are exposed to unique occupational hazards when it comes to zoonotic disease. In the US, studies have highlighted an increased risk of injuries and lack of veterinary awareness of these hazards. Research has proved the importance for continued clinical veterinarian education on occupational risks associated with musculoskeletal injuries, animal bites, needle-sticks, and cuts.

A July 2020 report by the United Nations Environment Programme stated that the increase in zoonotic pandemics is directly attributable to anthropogenic destruction of nature and the increased global demand for meat, and that the industrial farming of pigs and chickens in particular will be a primary risk factor for the spillover of zoonotic diseases in the future. Habitat loss of viral reservoir species has been identified as a significant source in at least one spillover event.

Wildlife trade or animal attacks 
The wildlife trade may increase spillover risk because it directly increases the number of interactions across animal species, sometimes in small spaces. The origin of the ongoing COVID-19 pandemic is traced to the wet markets in China.
 Rabies

Insect vectors 
 African sleeping sickness
 Dirofilariasis
 Eastern equine encephalitis
 Japanese encephalitis
 Saint Louis encephalitis
 Scrub typhus
 Tularemia
 Venezuelan equine encephalitis
 West Nile fever
 Western equine encephalitis
 Zika fever

Pets 

Pets can transmit a number of diseases. Dogs and cats are routinely vaccinated against rabies. Pets can also transmit ringworm and Giardia, which are endemic in both animal and human populations. Toxoplasmosis is a common infection of cats; in humans it is a mild disease although it can be dangerous to pregnant women. Dirofilariasis is caused by Dirofilaria immitis through mosquitoes infected by mammals like dogs and cats. Cat-scratch disease is caused by Bartonella henselae and Bartonella quintana, which are transmitted by fleas that are endemic to cats. Toxocariasis is the infection of humans by any of species of roundworm, including species specific to dogs (Toxocara canis) or cats (Toxocara cati). Cryptosporidiosis can be spread to humans from pet lizards, such as the leopard gecko. Encephalitozoon cuniculi is a microsporidial parasite carried by many mammals, including rabbits, and is an important opportunistic pathogen in people immunocompromised by HIV/AIDS, organ transplantation, or CD4+ T-lymphocyte deficiency.

Pets may also serve as a reservoir of viral disease and contribute to the chronic presence of certain viral diseases in the human population. For instance, approximately 20% of domestic dogs, cats and horses carry anti-Hepatitis E virus antibodies and thus these animals probably contribute to human Hepatitis E burden as well. For non-vulnerable populations (people who are not immunocompromised) the associated disease burden is, however, small.

Exhibition 
Outbreaks of zoonoses have been traced to human interaction with, and exposure to, other animals at fairs, live animal markets, petting zoos, and other settings. In 2005, the Centers for Disease Control and Prevention (CDC) issued an updated list of recommendations for preventing zoonosis transmission in public settings. The recommendations, developed in conjunction with the National Association of State Public Health Veterinarians, include educational responsibilities of venue operators, limiting public animal contact, and animal care and management.

Hunting and bushmeat 

 HIV
 SARS

Deforestation, biodiversity loss and environmental degradation

Kate Jones, Chair of Ecology and Biodiversity at University College London, says zoonotic diseases are increasingly linked to environmental change and human behaviour. The disruption of pristine forests driven by logging, mining, road building through remote places, rapid urbanisation and population growth is bringing people into closer contact with animal species they may never have been near before. The resulting transmission of disease from wildlife to humans, she says, is now "a hidden cost of human economic development". In a guest article, published by IPBES, President of the EcoHealth Alliance and zoologist Peter Daszak, along with three co-chairs of the 2019 Global Assessment Report on Biodiversity and Ecosystem Services, Josef Settele, Sandra Díaz, and Eduardo Brondizio, wrote that "rampant deforestation, uncontrolled expansion of agriculture, intensive farming, mining and infrastructure development, as well as the exploitation of wild species have created a 'perfect storm' for the spillover of diseases from wildlife to people."

Joshua Moon, Clare Wenham and Sophie Harman said that there is evidence that decreased biodiversity has an effect on the diversity of hosts and frequency of human-animal interactions with potential for pathogenic spillover.

An April 2020 study, published in the Proceedings of the Royal Society Part B journal, found that increased virus spillover events from animals to humans can be linked to biodiversity loss and environmental degradation, as humans further encroach on wildlands to engage in agriculture, hunting and resource extraction they become exposed to pathogens which normally would remain in these areas. Such spillover events have been tripling every decade since 1980. An August 2020 study, published in Nature, concludes that the anthropogenic destruction of ecosystems for the purpose of expanding agriculture and human settlements reduces biodiversity and allows for smaller animals such as bats and rats, who are more adaptable to human pressures and also carry the most zoonotic diseases, to proliferate. This in turn can result in more pandemics.

In October 2020, the Intergovernmental Science-Policy Platform on Biodiversity and Ecosystem Services published its report on the 'era of pandemics' by 22 experts in a variety of fields, and concluded that anthropogenic destruction of biodiversity is paving the way to the pandemic era, and could result in as many as 850,000 viruses being transmitted from animals – in particular birds and mammals – to humans. The increased pressure on ecosystems is being driven by the "exponential rise" in consumption and trade of commodities such as meat, palm oil, and metals, largely facilitated by developed nations, and by a growing human population. According to Peter Daszak, the chair of the group who produced the report, "there is no great mystery about the cause of the Covid-19 pandemic, or of any modern pandemic. The same human activities that drive climate change and biodiversity loss also drive pandemic risk through their impacts on our environment."

Climate change 

According to a report from the United Nations Environment Programme and International Livestock Research Institute, entitled "Preventing the next pandemic – Zoonotic diseases and how to break the chain of transmission," climate change is one of the 7 human-related causes of the increase in the number of zoonotic diseases. The University of Sydney issued a study, in March 2021, that examines factors increasing the likelihood of epidemics and pandemics like the COVID-19 pandemic. The researchers found that "pressure on ecosystems, climate change and economic development are key factors" in doing so. More zoonotic diseases were found in high-income countries.

In 2022, a big study dedicated to the link between climate change and Zoonosis was published. The study found a strong link between climate change and the epidemic emergence in the last 15 years, as it caused a massive migration of species to new areas, and consequently contact between species which do not normally come in contact with one another. Even in a scenario with weak climatic changes, there will be 15,000 spillover of viruses to new hosts in the next decades. The areas with the most possibilities for spillover are the mountainous tropical regions of Africa and southeast Asia. Southeast Asia is especially vulnerable as it has a large number of bat species that generally do not mix, but could easily if climate change forced them to begin migrating.

A 2021 study found possible links between climate change and transmission of COVID-19 through bats. The authors suggest that climate-driven changes in the distribution and robustness of bat species harboring coronaviruses may have occurred in eastern Asian hotspots (southern China, Myanmar and Laos), constituting a driver behind the evolution and spread of the virus.

Secondary transmission

 Ebola and Marburg are examples of viral hemorrhagic disease.

History 
During most of human prehistory groups of hunter-gatherers were probably very small. Such groups probably made contact with other such bands only rarely. Such isolation would have caused epidemic diseases to be restricted to any given local population, because propagation and expansion of epidemics depend on frequent contact with other individuals who have not yet developed an adequate immune response. To persist in such a population, a pathogen either had to be a chronic infection, staying present and potentially infectious in the infected host for long periods, or it had to have other additional species as reservoir where it can maintain itself until further susceptible hosts are contacted and infected. In fact, for many "human" diseases, the human is actually better viewed as an accidental or incidental victim and a dead-end host. Examples include rabies, anthrax, tularemia and West Nile virus. Thus, much of human exposure to infectious disease has been zoonotic.

Many diseases, even epidemic ones, have zoonotic origin and measles, smallpox, influenza, HIV, and diphtheria are particular examples. Various forms of the common cold and tuberculosis also are adaptations of strains originating in other species. Some experts have suggested that all human viral infections were originally zoonotic.

Zoonoses are of interest because they are often previously unrecognized diseases or have increased virulence in populations lacking immunity. The West Nile virus first appeared in the United States in 1999, in the New York City area. Bubonic plague is a zoonotic disease, as are salmonellosis, Rocky Mountain spotted fever, and Lyme disease.

A major factor contributing to the appearance of new zoonotic pathogens in human populations is increased contact between humans and wildlife. This can be caused either by encroachment of human activity into wilderness areas or by movement of wild animals into areas of human activity. An example of this is the outbreak of Nipah virus in peninsular Malaysia, in 1999, when intensive pig farming began within the habitat of infected fruit bats. The unidentified infection of these pigs amplified the force of infection, transmitting the virus to farmers, and eventually causing 105 human deaths.

Similarly, in recent times avian influenza and West Nile virus have spilled over into human populations probably due to interactions between the carrier host and domestic animals. Highly mobile animals, such as bats and birds, may present a greater risk of zoonotic transmission than other animals due to the ease with which they can move into areas of human habitation.

Because they depend on the human host for part of their life-cycle, diseases such as African schistosomiasis, river blindness, and elephantiasis are not defined as zoonotic, even though they may depend on transmission by insects or other vectors.

Use in vaccines 
The first vaccine against smallpox by Edward Jenner in 1800 was by infection of a zoonotic bovine virus which caused a disease called cowpox. Jenner had noticed that milkmaids were resistant to smallpox. Milkmaids contracted a milder version of the disease from infected cows that conferred cross immunity to the human disease. Jenner abstracted an infectious preparation of 'cowpox' and subsequently used it to inoculate persons against smallpox. As a result, smallpox has been eradicated globally, and mass vaccination against this disease ceased in 1981. There are a variety of vaccine varieties, including traditional inactivated pathogen vaccines, Subunit vaccines, live attenuated vaccines. There are also new vaccine technologies such as viral vector vaccines and DNA/RNA Vaccines, which includes the SARS-CoV-2 Coronavirus vaccines.

Lists of diseases

See also

References

Bibliography 

 .
 
 
 
 H. Krauss, A. Weber, M. Appel, B. Enders, A. v. Graevenitz, H. D. Isenberg, H. G. Schiefer, W. Slenczka, H. Zahner: Zoonoses. Infectious Diseases Transmissible from Animals to Humans. 3rd Edition, 456 pages. ASM Press. American Society for Microbiology, Washington, D.C., 2003. .

External links 

 AVMA Collections: Zoonosis Updates
 WHO tropical diseases and zoonoses
 Detection and Forensic Analysis of Wildlife and Zoonotic Disease
 Publications in Zoonotics and Wildlife Disease
  A message from nature: coronavirus. United Nations Environment Programme

 
Animal diseases
Disease ecology
Infectious diseases